('Devil's Peak') is the highest peak on the Baja California peninsula, measuring . It is alternately called , meaning 'Hill of the Enchanted' or 'Hill of the Bewitched'. The peak is located in the Sierra de San Pedro Mártir, a part of the Peninsular Ranges in the Mexican state of Baja California.

Climate
The peak has either a cold-summer Mediterranean climate (Csc) or a Mediterranean-influenced subarctic climate (Dsc)in the Köppen climate classification depending whether the threshold for those climates is considered 0°C or -3°C .

See also
 List of mountains in Mexico
 Mountain peaks of North America
 List of Ultras of Mexico

References 

Mountain peaks of Ensenada Municipality
Mountains of Baja California
•